Cabramatta West is a suburb of Sydney, in the state of New South Wales, Australia 32 kilometres south-west of the Sydney central business district, in the local government area of the City of Fairfield. It is part of the south-western region.
Cabramatta is a separate suburb, to the east.

History
Cabramatta West was originally a part of the suburb Cabramatta. In the dialect of the original inhabitants, the Cabrogal, a cabra was a tasty fresh water grub. A  block of land in the area, owned by the Bull family, was named Cabramatta Park and the name gradually spread to the surrounding area.

Demographics
According to the 2016 census, there were 7,222 residents in Cabramatta West. 41.6% of people were born in Australia. The next most common countries of birth were Vietnam 28.4%, Cambodia 6.6%, New Zealand 1.8%, Italy 1.8% and Iraq 1.6%.  20.2% of people spoke only English at home. Other languages spoken at home included Vietnamese 39.9%, Khmer 6.3%, Cantonese 5.3%, Arabic 3.2% and Mandarin 3.0%. 
The most common responses for religion were Buddhism 37.7%, Catholic 20.2% and No Religion 16.4%.

Commercial area
The primary shopping centre is located on what is known locally as Cooks Hill.

References

 

Suburbs of Sydney
City of Fairfield